Knutsson is a Nordic, mostly Swedish surname.

Geographical distribution
As of 2014, 93.1% of all known bearers of the surname Knutsson were residents of Sweden, 2.7% of Denmark, 1.7% of Norway and 1.1% of the United States.

In Sweden, the frequency of the surname was higher than national average in the following counties:
 1. Blekinge (1:606)
 2. Jönköping (1:817)
 3. Kalmar (1:953)
 4. Skåne (1:1,010)
 5. Östergötland (1:1,011)
 6. Kronoberg (1:1,013)
 7. Västra Götaland (1:1,308)
 8. Värmland (1:1,401)
 9. Halland (1:1,442)

People
Aad Knutsson Gjelle (1768–1840), Norwegian cartographer
Alv Knutsson (c. 1420–1496), Norwegian nobleman 
Anders Knutsson Ångström (1888–1981), Swedish physicist and meteorologist 
Atli Knútsson (born 1975), Icelandic football goalkeeper
Björn Knutsson (born 1938), Swedish speedway rider
Charles VIII of Sweden (Karl Knutsson, 1409–1470), king of Sweden and Norway 
Eric X of Sweden (Erik Knutsson, c. 1180–1216), King of Sweden 
Gösta Knutsson (1908–1973), Swedish radio producer and writer 
Greta Knutson (1899–1983), Swedish modernist visual artist, art critic, short story writer and poet
Gunilla Knutsson, Swedish model, actress and author
Inger Knutsson (born 1955), Swedish Olympic middle-distance runner
Helene Hellmark Knutsson (born 1969), Swedish politician 
Holmger Knutsson (1210s–1248), Swedish nobleman and claimant to the Swedish throne 
Knut Knutsson Steintjønndalen (1887–1969), Norwegian Hardanger fiddle maker 
Magnus Knutsson (born 1963), Swedish cyclist
Nalle Knutsson (1943–2012), Swedish musical artist, actor, party planner and clothing designer
Svantepolk of Viby (Svantepolk Knutsson, died 1310), Scandinavian magnate
Svein Knutsson (c. 1016–1035), son of Cnut the Great, king of Denmark, Norway, and England
Thomas Knutsson (born 1958), Swedish Olympic shooter
Torkel Knutsson (?–1306), constable, privy council, and virtual ruler of Sweden
Viktor Knutsson (1886–1969), Swedish sports shooter

See also
Knutsen
8534 Knutsson, a minor planet

References

Swedish-language surnames
Norwegian-language surnames
Surnames from given names